Fort MacKay/Horizon Airport  is located  north-northwest of Fort McKay, Alberta, Canada.

Fort Mackay/Horizon Airport is an airfield built to service the Horizon Oil Sands project of Canadian Natural Resources. It is built and certified for aircraft up to and including B737.

Airlines and destinations

References

External links
Page about this airport on COPA's Places to Fly airport directory

Registered aerodromes in Alberta
Transport in the Regional Municipality of Wood Buffalo